Timothy Williamson  (born 6 August 1955) is a British philosopher whose main research interests are in philosophical logic, philosophy of language, epistemology and metaphysics.  He is the Wykeham Professor of Logic at the University of Oxford, and fellow of New College, Oxford.

Education and career 
Born on 6 August 1955, Williamson's education began at Leighton Park School and continued at Henley Grammar School (now the Henley College). He then went to Balliol College, Oxford University. He graduated in 1976 with a Bachelor of Arts degree with first-class honours in mathematics and philosophy, and in 1980 with a doctorate in philosophy (DPhil) for a thesis entitled The Concept of Approximation to the Truth.

Prior to taking up the Wykeham Professorship in 2000, Williamson was Professor of Logic and Metaphysics at the University of Edinburgh (1995–2000); fellow and lecturer in philosophy at University College, Oxford (1988–1994); and lecturer in philosophy at Trinity College, Dublin (1980–1988).

He has been visiting professor at Yale University, Princeton University, MIT, the University of Michigan, and the Chinese University of Hong Kong.

He was president of the Aristotelian Society from 2004 to 2005.

He is a Fellow of the British Academy (FBA), the Norwegian Academy of Science and Letters, Fellow of the Royal Society of Edinburgh (FRSE), and a Foreign Honorary Fellow of the American Academy of Arts & Sciences.

Since 2022 he is visiting professor at the Università della Svizzera Italiana.

Philosophical work 
Williamson has contributed to analytic philosophy of language, logic, metaphysics and epistemology.

On vagueness, he holds a position known as epistemicism, which states that every seemingly vague predicate (like "bald" or "thin") actually has a sharp cutoff, which is impossible for us to know. For instance, there is some number of hairs such that anyone with that number is bald, and anyone with even one more hair is not. In actuality, this condition will be spelled out only partly in terms of numbers of hairs, but whatever measures are relevant will have some sharp cutoff. This solution to the difficult Sorites paradox was considered an astonishing and unacceptable consequence, but has become a relatively mainstream view since his defence of it. Williamson is fond of using the statement, "no one knows whether I am thin" to illustrate his view.

In epistemology, Williamson suggests that the concept of knowledge is unanalysable. This went against the common trend in philosophical literature up to that point, which was to argue that knowledge could be analysed into constituent concepts. (Typically this would be justified true belief plus an extra factor.) He agrees that knowledge entails justification, truth and belief, but argues that it is conceptually primitive. He accounts for the importance of belief by discussing its connections with knowledge, but avoids the disjunctivist position of saying that belief can be analysed as the disjunction of knowledge with some distinct, non-factive mental state.

Williamson also argues against the traditional distinction of knowing-how and knowing-that. He says that knowledge-how is a type of knowledge-that. Williamson argues that knowledge-how does not relate one's ability. As an example, he gives a ski instructor who knows how to perform a complex move without having the ability to do it himself.

In metaphysics, Williamson defends necessitism, according to which necessarily everything is necessarily something, in short, that everything exists of necessity. Necessitism is associated with the Barcan formula: it is possible for something to have a property only if there is something which has that property. Thus, since it is possible for Wittgenstein to have had a child, there is something which is a possible child of Wittgenstein. However, Williamson has also developed an ontology of bare possibilia which he argues alleviates the worst consequences of necessitism and of the Barcan formula. It's not that Wittgenstein's possible child is concrete; rather, it is contingently non-concrete.

Publications 
 Identity and Discrimination, Oxford: Blackwell, 1990.
 Vagueness, London: Routledge, 1994.
 Knowledge and Its Limits, Oxford: Oxford University Press, 2000.
 The Philosophy of Philosophy, Oxford: Blackwell, 2007
  
 Modal Logic as Metaphysics, Oxford: Oxford University Press, 2013.
 Tetralogue: I'm Right, You're Wrong, Oxford: Oxford University Press, 2015.
Doing Philosophy: From Common Curiosity to Logical Reasoning, Oxford University Press, 2017.
Suppose and Tell: The Semantics and Heuristics of Conditionals, Oxford University Press, 2020.

Williamson has also published more than 120 articles in peer-reviewed scholarly journals.

References

External links
 Profile at University of Oxford
 An in-depth autobiographical interview with Timothy Williamson
 Interview at 3:AM Magazine
 Università della Svizzera Italiana professors.

1955 births
20th-century British non-fiction writers
20th-century British philosophers
20th-century essayists
21st-century British non-fiction writers
21st-century British philosophers
21st-century essayists
Academics of the University of Edinburgh
Academics of Trinity College Dublin
Analytic philosophers
Aristotelian philosophers
Atheist philosophers
British atheists
British logicians
British male essayists
British social commentators
Epistemologists
Fellows of New College, Oxford
Fellows of the British Academy
Fellows of the Royal Society of Edinburgh
Fellows of University College, Oxford
Living people
Members of the Norwegian Academy of Science and Letters
Metaphysicians
Ontologists
People from Uppsala
Philosophers of language
Philosophers of logic
Philosophers of mathematics
Philosophers of mind
Philosophy academics
Philosophy writers
Presidents of the Aristotelian Society
Social philosophers
Wykeham Professors of Logic